The 1938 Colorado gubernatorial election was held on November 8, 1938. Republican nominee Ralph Lawrence Carr defeated Democratic incumbent Teller Ammons with 59.50% of the vote.

Democratic primary

Candidates
 Teller Ammons, incumbent Governor of Colorado
 George J. Knapp, Pueblo newspaper publisher

Dropped out
 Elmer E. Headlee, State Senator from Monte Vista

Campaign
First-term Democratic Governor Teller Ammons ran for re-election and faced uncertain opposition in the Democratic primary. He initially faced a primary challenge from conservative State Senator Elmer E. Headlee, who represented the San Luis Valley. However, at the state Democratic convention, Headlee ended his campaign, apparently concerned that he lacked enough votes to continue his campaign to the primary election. Accordingly, Ammons was nominated without opposition. Prior to the primary, however, Pueblo newspaper editor George J. Knapp, who had previously run for Congress as a Republican in 1936, gathered enough signatures to challenge Ammons for renomination. Despite being entirely unknown, Knapp held Ammons to just 62% of the vote, winning several counties through the state and triggering speculation as to the nature of Ammons's weak performance.

Results

Republican primary

Candidates
 Ralph Lawrence Carr, former United States Attorney for the District of Colorado

Dropped out
 Charles M. Armstrong, former Colorado State Treasurer, 1936 Republican nominee for Governor
 Benjamin Snodgrass, Denver coal operator

Campaign
In the leadup to the state Republican convention, the two frontrunners for the nomination for Governor appeared to be former State Treasurer Charles M. Armstrong, who had run unsuccessfully as the party's nominee in 1936, and coal operator Benjamin Snodgrass, who was supported by former Senator Lawrence C. Phipps and his allies. However, party leaders were angling for a third candidate and considered former State Senator Nate C. Warren, Colorado Springs Mayor George Birdsall, and former U.S. Attorney Ralph Carr. All alternative candidacies were declined or scuttled, but Carr ultimately changed his mind and sought the nomination. In the face of the unified front in favor of Carr, Armstrong withdrew at the convention. And though Snodgrass won enough votes to secure a place on the primary election ballot, he ultimately withdrew from the race as well, allowing Carr to be nominated unopposed.

Results

General election

Results

References

1938
Colorado
Gubernatorial